Würenlos is a railway station in the municipality of Würenlos in the Swiss canton of Aargau. The station is located on the Furttal line. The station is served by service S6 of the Zurich S-Bahn.

References 

Railway stations in the canton of Aargau
Swiss Federal Railways stations